The Indian Agricultural Universities Association or IAUA is a registered Indian society based in New Delhi which aims to promote agricultural research, education and extension in universities and states.

List of members

Institution of National Importance
 Rani Lakshmi Bai Central Agricultural University

Central Universities
 Central Agricultural University

Deemed Universities

 National Dairy Research Institute
 Indian Agricultural Research Institute
 Indian Veterinary Research Institute
 Central Institute of Fisheries Education

State Universities

 Acharya N.G. Ranga Agricultural University
 Assam Agricultural University
 Banda University of Agriculture and Technology
 Dr. Balasaheb Sawant Konkan Krishi Vidyapeeth
 Birsa Agricultural University
 Bidhan Chandra Krishi Viswavidyalaya
 Chaudhary Charan Singh Haryana Agricultural University
 Chandra Shekhar Azad University of Agriculture and Technology
 Chaudhary Sarwan Kumar Himachal Pradesh Krishi Vishvavidyalaya
 Sardarkrushinagar Dantiwada Agricultural University
 Govind Ballabh Pant University of Agriculture & Technology
 Indira Gandhi Krishi Vishwa Vidyalaya
 Jawaharlal Nehru Agricultural University
 Kerala Agricultural University
 Marathwada Agricultural University
 Mahatma Phule Krishi Vidyapeeth
 Maharana Pratap University of Agriculture and Technology
 Narendra Dev University of Agriculture and Technology
 Orissa University of Agriculture and Technology
 Dr. Panjabrao Deshmukh Krishi Vidyapeeth
 Punjab Agricultural University
 Rajendra Agricultural University
 Rajasthan Agricultural University
 Sam Higginbottom University of Agriculture, Technology and Sciences
 Sher-e-Kashmir University of Agricultural Sciences and Technology
 Sher-e-Kashmir University of Agricultural Sciences and Technology
 Tamil Nadu Agricultural University
 Tamil Nadu Veterinary and Animal Sciences University
 University of Agricultural Sciences
 University of Agricultural Sciences
 West Bengal University of Animal and Fishery Sciences
 Dr. Yashwant Singh Parmar University of Horticulture and Forestry
 Maharashtra Animal and Fishery Sciences University
 Uttar Banga Krishi Viswa Vidyalaya
 Sardar Vallabhbhai Patel University of Agriculture and Technology
 Uttar Pradesh Pandit Deen Dayal Upadhyaya Pashu Chikitsa Vigyan Vishwavidyalaya Evam Go Anusandhan Sansthan
 Navsari Agricultural University
 Anand Agricultural University
 Junagadh Agricultural University
 Guru Angad Dev Veterinary and Animal Sciences University
 Sri Venkateswara Veterinary University
 Karnataka Veterinary, Animal and Fisheries Sciences University
 Rajmata Vijayaraje Scindia Krishi Vishwavidyalaya
 University of Agricultural Sciences
 University of Horticultural Sciences, Bagalkot
 Bihar Agricultural University
 Uttarakhand University of Horticulture and Forestry
 Kerala Veterinary and Animal Sciences University
 National Backward Krishi Vidyapeeth, Solapur

References

 
College and university associations and consortia in Asia
Organisations based in Delhi